Buckatunna Creek is a stream in the U.S. state of Mississippi. It is a tributary to the Chickasawhay River.

Buckatunna Creek is a name derived from the Choctaw language meaning "creek at which there is weaving". Variant names are "Bucatunna Creek", "Buckatanna Creek", "Buckatanne River", "Buckatanny Creek", "Buckatonna Creek", "Buckhatannee Creek", and "Puckatunna Creek".

The creek lends its name to the community of Buckatunna, Mississippi.

References

Rivers of Mississippi
Rivers of Clarke County, Mississippi
Rivers of Lauderdale County, Mississippi
Rivers of Wayne County, Mississippi
Mississippi placenames of Native American origin